Federico Astudillo (born January 6, 1981) is an Argentine former association football forward who played in Bolivia, Spain and Mexico as well as in his native country.

References
 
 

1981 births
Living people
Argentine expatriate footballers
Argentine footballers
Argentine expatriate sportspeople in Spain
Racing de Córdoba footballers
Chacarita Juniors footballers
Talleres de Córdoba footballers
Juventud Antoniana footballers
Sportivo Italiano footballers
Oriente Petrolero players
Club León footballers
Argentine Primera División players
Liga MX players
Expatriate footballers in Bolivia
Expatriate footballers in Mexico
Expatriate footballers in Spain
Association football forwards
Sportspeople from Córdoba Province, Argentina